United States gubernatorial elections are scheduled to be held on November 5, 2024, in 11 states and two territories. The previous gubernatorial elections for this group of states took place in 2020, except in New Hampshire and Vermont where governors only serve two-year terms and elected their governors in 2022.

In addition to state gubernatorial elections, the territories of American Samoa and Puerto Rico will also hold elections for their governors.

The elections will take place concurrently with the 2024 presidential election, elections to the House of Representatives and Senate, and numerous state and local elections.

Election predictions

Several sites and individuals published predictions of competitive seats. These predictions looked at factors such as the strength of the incumbent (if the incumbent is running for re-election), the strength of the candidates, and the partisan leanings of the state (reflected in part by the state's Cook Partisan Voting Index rating). The predictions assigned ratings to each seat, with the rating indicating a party's predicted advantage in winning that seat.

Most election predictors use:
 "tossup": no advantage
 "tilt" (used by some predictors): advantage that is not quite as strong as "lean"
 "lean": slight advantage
 "likely": significant, but surmountable, advantage 
 "safe" or "solid": near-certain chance of victory

Race summary

States

Territories

Delaware

Governor John Carney was re-elected to a second term in 2020 with 59.5% of the vote. He will be term-limited by the Delaware Constitution in 2024 and cannot seek re-election for a third term.

Indiana

Governor Eric Holcomb was re-elected to a second term in 2020 with 56.5% of the vote. He will be term-limited by the Indiana Constitution in 2024 and cannot seek re-election for a third consecutive term. Former president of the Indiana Economic Development Corporation Eric Doden is running for the Republican nomination. United States Senator Mike Braun has announced an intention to seek the Republican gubernatorial nomination.

Missouri 

Governor Mike Parson took office on June 1, 2018, upon the resignation of Eric Greitens and was elected to a full term in his own right in 2020 with 57.2% of the vote. Because Parson served more than two years of Greitens' term, he will be term-limited by the Missouri Constitution in 2024 and cannot seek re-election for a second full term. Lieutenant Governor Mike Kehoe is running for the Republican gubernatorial nomination.

Montana

Governor Greg Gianforte was elected in 2020 with 54.4% of the vote. He is eligible to run for re-election, but has not yet stated whether he will do so.

New Hampshire

Governor Chris Sununu won reelection to a fourth term in 2022. Because New Hampshire does not have gubernatorial term limits in its constitution, he will be eligible to run for re-election for a historic fifth term in 2024. Former Hillsborough County Treasurer and 2022 Congressional nominee Robert Burns expressed interest if Sununu does not seek a fifth term. Potential candidates include 2022 Democratic nominee Tom Sherman. Steve Marchand, a previous Democratic candidate for Governor, has declined to run.

North Carolina

Governor Roy Cooper was re-elected to a second term in 2020 with 51.5% of the vote. He will be term-limited by the North Carolina Constitution in 2024 and cannot seek re-election for a third consecutive term. Democratic attorney general Josh Stein is running for the Democratic gubernatorial nomination, while Republican lieutenant governor Mark Robinson has been viewed as a potential candidate.

North Dakota 

Governor Doug Burgum was re-elected to a second term in 2020 with 65.8% of the vote. In the 2022 election, voters amended the North Dakota Constitution to place a limit of two, four-year terms for Governors sworn into office after the amendment's effective date of January 1, 2023. Burgum, sworn into office before the amendment's effective date, remains eligible to run for re-election for a third term and has expressed interest in doing so. In November 2022, voters in the state approved a constitutional amendment that limits succeeding governors to no more than two four-year terms. The amendment only applies to individuals elected after 2023.

Utah

Governor Spencer Cox was elected in 2020 with 63% of the vote and is running for reelection to a second term. Although Utah does not have gubernatorial term limits, he has pledged to only serve two terms.

Vermont

Governor Phil Scott won reelection to a fourth term in 2022. Because Vermont does not have gubernatorial term limits in its constitution, he will be eligible to run for re-election for a fifth term in 2024.

Washington

Governor Jay Inslee was re-elected to a third term in 2020 with 56.6% of the vote. Because Washington does not have gubernatorial term limits in its constitution, he is eligible to run for re-election for a fourth term and has filed paperwork to do so. If Inslee were to run for re-election to a fourth term and win, he would become the longest serving governor in Washington history. Should Inslee retire, Washington attorney general Bob Ferguson and Washington State Commissioner of Public Lands Hilary Franz have been mentioned as a potential candidates.

West Virginia

Governor Jim Justice was re-elected to a second term in 2020 with 63.5% of the vote. He will be term-limited by the West Virginia Constitution in 2024 and is ineligible to seek re-election for a third consecutive term. Businessman and son of U.S. Representative Carol Miller, Chris Miller is running for the Republican gubernatorial nomination. as so is auditor of West Virginia JB McCuskey.

Territories

American Samoa

Governor Lemanu Peleti Mauga was elected in 2020 with 60.3% of the vote. He is eligible to run for re-election, but has not yet stated whether he will do so.

Puerto Rico

Governor Pedro Pierluisi was elected in 2020 with 32.9% of the vote. He is eligible to run for re-election, and stated that he would on March 20, 2022 during the New Progressive Party's general assembly.

See also
 2024 United States elections
 2024 United States presidential election
 2024 United States House of Representatives elections
 2024 United States Senate elections

Notes

References

 
Gubernatorial
November 2024 events in the United States